The Jenny and Antti Wihuri Foundation is a Finnish non-profit organization founded in 1942 by industrialist Antti Wihuri and his wife, Jenny Wihuri, with the purpose of supporting cultural and economic development in Finland. The Foundation awards scholarships and prizes on an annual basis on October 9, the birthday of Antti Wihuri. Between 1942 and 2016, the Foundation had awarded grants of 274 million of euros. In 2016, the total value of grants and prizes awarded by the Foundation amounted to 11,2 million euros.

Wihuri Research Institute 

The Jenny and Antti Wihuri Research Institute was founded in 1944 with the aim of creating the conditions for high-quality research in the field of natural sciences, medicine and technical sciences. The Wihuri Research Institute focuses on cardiovascular research, and is particularly renowned for the innovative research it conducts on major chronic diseases. The Institute is currently headed by Professor Kari Alitalo.

Art collection 
Since 1957, the Jenny and Antti Wihuri Foundation has built up a large collection of Finnish contemporary art. In 1983, the Foundation’s Board of Directors donated nearly 500 pieces of the collection to the City of Rovaniemi on the occasion of the 100th anniversary of Atti Wihuri’s birth.

Wihuri Foundation for International Prizes 
The Wihuri Foundation for International Prizes was founded in 1953 by Antti Wihuri. The Fund’s purpose is to distribute international awards, notably the Wihuri Sibelius Prize in recognition of creative work that has specially furthered and developed the cultural and economic progress of mankind. These prizes may be awarded to private individuals or organizations regardless of nationality, religion, race or language. Throughout its 62 years of operating the Foundation has awarded 35 prizes in total of which 18 have been Wihuri International Prize awarded to scientists.

Wihuri Sibelius Prize

Wihuri International Prize

Sources

External links 
 

Foundations based in Finland